Pitmedden railway station was a railway station near Pitmedden House in Dyce, Aberdeen.

Previous services

References

Notes

Sources
 
 

Disused railway stations in Aberdeen
Beeching closures in Scotland
Former Great North of Scotland Railway stations
Railway stations in Great Britain opened in 1874
Railway stations in Great Britain closed in 1964
1874 establishments in Scotland
1964 disestablishments in Scotland